George William Curtis (February 24, 1824 – August 31, 1892) was an American writer and public speaker born in Providence, Rhode Island. An early Republican, he spoke in favor of African-American equality and civil rights both before and after the Civil War.

Early life and education

Curtis, the son of George and Mary Elizabeth (Burrill) Curtis, was born in Providence on February 24, 1824. His mother died when he was two. His maternal grandfather, James Burrill Jr., served in the United States Senate representing Rhode Island from 1817 to 1820.

At six he was sent with his elder brother to school in Jamaica Plain, Massachusetts, where he remained for five years. Then, his father having again married happily, the boys were brought home to Providence, where they stayed till, in around 1839, their father moved to New York. Three years later, Curtis, fell in sympathy with the spirit of the Transcendental movement. He joined the communal experiment known as Brook Farm from 1842 to 1843. He was accompanied by his brother, James Burrill Curtis, whose influence on him was strong and helpful. He remained there for two years, and met many interesting men and women. Then came two years, passed partly in New York, partly in Concord, Massachusetts, in order mainly to be in the friendly neighborhood of Ralph Waldo Emerson, and then followed four years spent in Europe, Egypt and Syria.

He married Anna Shaw Curtis at the Unitarian Church of the Redeemer in 1856. Curtis, another New England transplant to Staten Island, was a founding member of the Unitarian Church of Staten Island (originally the Unitarian Church of the Redeemer), an author, editor of Putnam's Magazine, and columnist for Harper's Weekly. He was an abolitionist and supporter of civil rights for African Americans and Native Americans. He also advocated women's suffrage, civil service reform, and public education.

The Curtis and Shaw families, rooted as they were in the liberal soil of New England, counted Emerson, Nathaniel Hawthorne and Henry David Thoreau among their close associates.

The Underground Railroad was in use during the 1850s to help runaway slaves, and it is believed that the Curtises and the Shaws were very involved in the Railroad. The Shaw sisters, Anna and Josephine, and their mother, Sarah Sturgis, also spearheaded local efforts to help during the Civil War. George Curtis was targeted by Southern sympathizers, and Anna and her three children left Staten Island temporarily during the New York City draft riots in 1863 for the safety of her grandparents’ home in Roxbury, Massachusetts.

Career
Curtis returned from Europe in 1850, attractive, accomplished, and ambitious for literary distinction. He settled on Staten Island and instantly plunged into the whirl of life in New York, obtained a post on the New-York Tribune, became a popular lecturer, started work on Nile Notes of a Howadji (1851), and became a favorite in society. He wrote for Putnam's Magazine which he helped George Palmer Putnam to found. He became an associate editor along with Parke Godwin and managing editor Charles Frederick Briggs; the three also collaborated on a gift book called The Homes of American Authors (1853).

Curtis produced a number of volumes, composed of essays written for Putnam's and for Harper's Weekly, which came in rapid succession from his pen. The chief of these were the Potiphar Papers (1853), a satire on the fashionable society of the day; and Prue and I (1856), a pleasantly sentimental, fancifully tender and humorous study of life. In 1855 he married Anna Shaw, daughter of abolitionist Francis Shaw and sister of Robert Gould Shaw of the famed 54th Massachusetts Volunteer Infantry.  Not long afterwards he became, through no fault of his own, deeply involved in debt owing to the failure of Putnam's Magazine; and his sense of honour compelled him to spend the greater part of his earnings for many years on discharging the obligations for which he had become responsible, and from which he might have freed himself by legal process. In the period just preceding the Civil War, other interests became subordinate to those of national concern. He was involved in the founding of the Republican Party, and made his first important speech on the questions of the day at Wesleyan University in 1856; he engaged actively in John C. Fremont's presidential campaign of 1856 (the Republican campaign headquarters were located not far from his Staten Island home), and was soon recognized not only as an effective public speaker, but also as one of the ablest, most high-minded, and most trustworthy leaders of public opinion.

In 1862 George William Curtis delivered his "Doctrine of Liberty" address to the Phi Beta Kappa Society at Harvard, on behalf of President Abraham Lincoln, who was encouraging support for the Emancipation Proclamation. In it, he laid out the intellectual foundations for the purpose of American education that would last another 30 years, and public schools, nearly 100 years.

In 1863 he became the political editor of Harper's Weekly, which was highly influential in shaping public opinion. Curtis's writing was always clear and direct, displaying fairness of mind and good temper. He had high moral standards. From month to month he contributed to Harper's Magazine, under the title of "The Easy Chair," brief essays on topics of social and literary interest, charming in style, touched with delicate humour and instinct with generous spirit. His service to the Republican party was such, that he was offered several nominations to office, and might have been sent as minister to England; but he refused all such offers, preferring to serve the country as editor and public speaker.

In 1871 he was appointed, by President Ulysses S. Grant, to chair the commission on the reform of the civil service. Its report was the foundation of every effort since made for the purification and regulation of the service and for the destruction of political patronage. From that time Curtis was the leader in this reform, and its progress is mainly due to him. He was president of the National Civil Service Reform League and of the New York Civil Service Reform Association. In 1884 he refused to support James G. Blaine as candidate for the presidency, and thus broke with the Republican party, of which he had been a founder and leader. From that time he stood as the typical independent in politics. In April 1892 he delivered at Baltimore his eleventh annual address as president of the National Civil Service Reform League, and in May he appeared for the last time in public, to repeat in New York an address on James Russell Lowell, which he had first delivered in Brooklyn on the 22nd of the preceding February, the anniversary of Lowell's birth.

Curtis was one of the original members of the Board of Education for what would become New York City, and advocated educational reforms. He was a member of and frequent speaker at the Unitarian Church on Staten Island (the congregation still meets in the same building). A high school not far from his home is named for him. He is also immortalized with an annual namesake oratorical prize awarded by Columbia College of Columbia University.

Works
 Notes of a Howadji (1851)
 The Howadji in Syria (1852)
 Lotus-Eating (1852)
 Potiphar Papers (1853) 
 The Duty of the American Scholar to Politics and the Times (1856)
 Prue and I (1856) 
 Trumps (1862)
 Washington Irving: A Sketch (1891)
 Essays from the Easy Chair (1892) 
 Other Essays from the Easy Chair (1893)
 Orations And Addresses (1894)
 Literary and Social Essays (1895) 
 Early Letters of George Wm. Curtis to John S. Dwight: Brook Farm and Concord (1898) 
 Ars Recte Vivendi (1898)

See also
Curtis High School on Staten Island is named for him. It was built in 1904.

Notes

Attribution:

References
 George William Curtis, by Edward Cary, in the American Men of Letters series (Boston, 1894)
 An Epistle to George William Curtis, by James Russell Lowell (1874–1887), in Lowell's Poems
 George William Curtis, a Commemorative Address delivered before The Century Association, December 17, 1892, by Parke Godwin (New York, 1893)
 Orations and Addresses by George William Curtis, edited by Charles Eliot Norton (5 vols. New York, 1894).
 
Galahad in the Gilded Age: A Life of George William Curtis, Linda Dowling. 528 pp. (United States: Xlibris, 2021)

External links

 
 
 
 George William Curtis Papers (MS Am 1124.5-1124.8) at Houghton Library, Harvard University.

1824 births
1892 deaths
19th-century American essayists
19th-century American journalists
19th-century American male writers
19th-century American non-fiction writers
19th-century Unitarians
Activists for African-American civil rights
American abolitionists
American essayists
American magazine editors
American male essayists
American male journalists
American male non-fiction writers
American satirists
American suffragists
American Unitarians
Civil service reform in the United States
Comedians from New York (state)
Journalists from New York City
Native Americans' rights activists
New York (state) Republicans
People from Jamaica Plain
People from Livingston, Staten Island
Rhode Island Republicans
Writers from Boston
Writers from Providence, Rhode Island
Harper's Weekly editors